The 1925–26 Rugby Football League season was the 31st season of rugby league football.

Season summary

Having ended the regular season as the league leaders, Wigan went on to claim their third Championship by beating Warrington 22-10 in the play-off final.

Swinton beat Oldham 9-3 in the Challenge Cup Final.

Wigan won the Lancashire League, and Hull Kingston Rovers won the Yorkshire League. Swinton beat Wigan 15–11 to win the Lancashire Cup, and Dewsbury beat Huddersfield 2–0 to win the Yorkshire County Cup.

Championship

Championship play-off

Challenge Cup

Swinton beat Oldham 9-3 in the final played at Rochdale before a crowd of 27,000.

This was Swinton’s second appearance in the Final and their second Cup Final win.  Their previous victory was in 1900.

References

Sources
1925-26 Rugby Football League season at wigan.rlfans.com
The Challenge Cup at The Rugby Football League website

1925 in English rugby league
1926 in English rugby league
Northern Rugby Football League seasons